Pietro Righini (2 August 1683 - 20 December 1742) was an Italian architect and scenic designer. Born in Parma, he was active as a scenic designer with both the Teatro Regio di Torino and the Teatro di San Carlo. He painted the scenes to Bajazet and the Nino Drammi by Francesco Gambarini in 1719-1720. Among his pupils is Vincenzo Dal Rè.

References

1683 births
1742 deaths
18th-century Italian architects
18th-century Italian painters
Italian male painters
Italian scenic designers
18th-century Italian male artists